Prince Edward—Hastings was a federal electoral district in Ontario, Canada, that existed in the House of Commons of Canada from 1968 to 2015. Its population in 2006 was 113,227. It was redistributed between Bay of Quinte electoral district and Hastings—Lennox and Addington electoral district as a result of the Canadian federal electoral redistribution, 2012.

History

The electoral district was created in 1966 from parts of Hastings South, Hastings—Frontenac, Northumberland, and Prince Edward—Lennox ridings.

It consisted of the County of Prince Edward, the Townships of Rawdon and Sidney (excluding the City of Belleville) in the County of Hastings, and the Townships of Brighton, Cramahe, Murray and Seymour in the County of Northumberland.

The electoral district was abolished in 1976 when it was redistributed between Northumberland and Prince Edward ridings, but Prince Edward riding was renamed "Prince Edward—Hastings" in 1978 before an election was held.

In 1976, Prince Edward riding was defined to consist of the County of Prince Edward, and, in the County of Hastings, the Townships of Hungerford, Huntingdon, Thurlow and Tyendinaga, the City of Belleville, and the Town of Deseronto, the Village of Frankford, and Tyendinaga Indian Reserve No. 38.

In 1996, it was redefined to consist of the County of Prince Edward, and the part of the County of Hastings lying south of and including the townships of Hungerford, Huntingdon and Rawdon, south of but excluding the Village of Stirling, and excluding the City of Trenton.

In 2003, it was redefined to consist of the County of Prince Edward and the County of Hastings (except the City of Quinte West).

As part of the Canadian federal electoral redistribution, 2012, the southern portion of district forms the bulk of the new Bay of Quinte district, while the northern portion becomes part of Hastings—Lennox and Addington.

Members of Parliament

This riding has elected the following Members of Parliament:

Election results

				

Note: Conservative vote is compared to the total of the Canadian Alliance and Progressive Conservative votes in the 2000 election.

Note: Canadian Alliance vote is compared to the Reform Party vote in the 1997 election.

See also
 List of Canadian federal electoral districts
 Past Canadian electoral districts

References

Riding history 1966-1976 from the Library of Parliament
Riding history 1978-2008 from the Library of Parliament
 2011 results from Elections Canada
 Campaign expense data from Elections Canada

Notes

Belleville, Ontario
Former federal electoral districts of Ontario